Michael Henry Jordan (February 7, 1863 in Lawrence, Massachusetts – September 25, 1940 in Lawrence, Massachusetts), nicknamed "Miltty", was a professional baseball player who played outfielder in the Major Leagues in . He would play for the Pittsburgh Alleghenys.

External links

1863 births
1940 deaths
Major League Baseball outfielders
Pittsburgh Alleghenys players
19th-century baseball players
Lawrence (minor league baseball) players
Portland (minor league baseball) players
Boston Blues players
Haverhill (minor league baseball) players
Dallas Tigers players
Auburn Yankees players
Washington Senators (minor league) players
Jamestown (minor league baseball) players
Davenport Pilgrims players
Allentown Colts players
Baseball players from Massachusetts